The Level of Mendalgief is a small area to the south west of the city centre of the city of Newport in the Pill ward. The level is bounded by Cardiff Road to the north, Mendalgief Road to the east, Docks Way to the south and the Great Western Main Line to the west. The area formerly contained the Monmouthshire Bank sidings, but it is due to be regenerated into a new residential area.

The etymology of the name Mendalgief is unknown.

Mendalgief